Ankyrin repeat and SOCS box protein 13 is a protein that in humans is encoded by the ASB13 gene.

The protein encoded by this gene is a member of the ankyrin repeat and SOCS box-containing (ASB) family of proteins. They contain ankyrin repeat sequence and a SOCS box domain. The SOCS box serves to couple suppressor of cytokine signalling (SOCS) proteins and their binding partners with the elongin B and C complex, possibly targeting them for degradation. Multiple alternatively spliced transcript variants have been described for this gene, but their full-length sequences are not known.

References

External links

Further reading